Rowland George "Roly" Horrey (born 7 March 1943) is an English former professional footballer who played as a winger in the Football League for Blackburn Rovers, York City and Cambridge United and in non-League football for Bishop Auckland, Ferryhill Athletic and Chelmsford City.

References

1943 births
Living people
Sportspeople from Bishop Auckland
Footballers from County Durham
English footballers
Association football wingers
Bishop Auckland F.C. players
Ferryhill Athletic F.C. players
Blackburn Rovers F.C. players
York City F.C. players
Cambridge United F.C. players
Chelmsford City F.C. players
English Football League players